Sassone is an Italian surname meaning "Saxon". Notable people with the surname include:

 Bob Sassone (born 1965), American writer
 Florindo Sassone (1912–1982), Argentinian violinist and composer
 Marco Sassone (born 1942), Italian painter
 Robert Sassone, American college basketball player and coach
 Vladimiro Sassone, Italian/British academic

Italian-language surnames